The tenor sarrusophone is the tenor member of the sarrusophone family of metal double reed wind instruments, pitched in B♭ with the same range as the tenor saxophone. They were originally made in the late 19th and early 20th century by Orsi, Gautrot and his successor Couesnon, and Evette & Schaeffer (now Buffet Crampon). Currently they are made only by Orsi on special order.

See also
 Sarrusophone
 Tenor saxophone

References

Single oboes with conical bore
Sarrusophones